The Cabinet Glogowski was the state government of the German state of Lower Saxony from 28 October 1998 until 14 December 1999. The Cabinet was headed by Minister President Gerhard Glogowski and was formed by the Social Democratic Party. On 28 October 1998, Minister President Gerhard Schröder resigned from his position as Minister President due to his new position as Chancellor. On the same day, Gerhard Glogowski was elected as his successor by the Landtag of Lower Saxony. It was succeeded by Siegmar Gabriel's Cabinet Gabriel.

Composition 

|}

References

Notes

Glogowski
1998 establishments in Germany
1999 disestablishments in Germany